Rugby union in Greece is a minor but growing sport.

Governing body
The governing body is the Hellenic Handball Federation after the Greek Government withdrew sports representation authority from the Hellenic Rugby Federation (Ελληνικής Ομοσπονδίας Ράγκμπι), which was affiliated to World Rugby. It was set up in 2004, at the instigation of the then Deputy Minister of Sport, George Orfanos, with the subsequent appointment of Dr Evangelos Stamos as President. Greece was suspended from World Rugby at the end of 2014 but was reinstated in May 2015 and has since been suspended again. An explanation has not been given for the suspension.

History
Rugby first appears to have been played by British sailors in Greece, probably in the early 20th century. However, it has not been well organised until recently. The Greek Diaspora emigrated to many rugby playing countries, notably England, South Africa and Australia, and some of these people have returned or informed their family about the game. A second factor is that a number of British expatriates have come to live in Greece and some have set up clubs. However, these invariably are not very inclusive of native Greeks .

Rugby started developing in Greece during the 1990s, and the setting up of the HRU in April 2005, led to the national team participating in the European Nations Cup in 2005, and the establishment of annual league competitions from 2005 to the present. This is partly due to pressure from rugby league in Greece which has started aggressive recruitment in recent years, and has set up a national team composed mostly of Greek Australians, managed by Colin Mylonas, himself an Australian. Although rugby union has a much longer history in Greece, the Greek Rugby League was set up in 2003.

Domestic Championship
The domestic championship began in 2005–06 and has been dominated by Athens RFC who won the first four championships.

In 2005–06 Athens claimed the title in unsatisfactory manner when Rhodes Colossi were unable to get to the final in Athens because bad weather prevented their ferry from leaving Rhodes. Athens were thus given a walkover although in fairness they had dominated the season and were clear favourites to win.

In 2006–07, Athens and Rhodes again made it to the final which Athens won 19 – 0 at the Zirinio Stadium in Athens. The following year the championship was played as a straight league with no Grand Final - Athens comfortably won it with Attica Springboks finishing as runners-up.

The 2008–09 season again saw Athens emerging triumphant although only after an exciting final against Attica Springboks at the stadium in Glyka Nera which Athens won 22 – 18.

Seven teams took part in the 2009–10 championship. These were Athens RFC, Athens Spartans, Attica Springboks, Iraklis Thessaloniki, Macedones Evosmos, Rhodes Colossi, Thessaloniki Lions. After a 44-match winning streak Athens were finally beaten by Rhodes on October 18, 2009.

See also
 Greece national rugby union team
 Greek Championship Rugby Union

References

External links
 FIRA AER page 
 official union page 
 Greek rugby rises a division
 Archives du Rugby: Grece
 Greek rugby home page at sportingreece.com
 Hellenic Rugby News (in Greek and English)
 Rugby In Greek (news for rugby union in Greek)
 Greek Rugby Championship (in Greek)
 Rugby Union in Greece (in Greek)
 Rugby Sevens in Greece (in Greek)